6398 Timhunter, provisional designation , is a stony Phocaea asteroid from the inner regions of the asteroid belt, approximately 5.5 kilometers in diameter. It was discovered on 10 February 1991, by American astronomer couple Carolyn and Eugene Shoemaker, in collaboration with Canadian astronomer David H. Levy at Palomar Observatory in California, United States. It was named for American amateur astronomer Tim Hunter.

Classification an orbit 

The stony S-type asteroid is a member of the Phocaea family, a relatively small group of asteroids with similar orbital characteristics. Timhunter orbits the Sun in the inner main-belt at a distance of 1.8–2.9 AU once every 3 years and 7 months (1,310 days). Its orbit has an eccentricity of 0.22 and an inclination of 24° with respect to the ecliptic.

Lightcurves 

In March 2009, a rotational lightcurve of Timhunter was obtained from photometric observations by astronomer Petr Pravec at the Ondřejov Observatory in the Czech Republic. Lightcurve analysis gave a well-defined rotation period of 14.55 hours with a brightness variation of 0.29 magnitude. One month later, another lightcurve was obtained by French amateur astronomers David Romeuf, Maurice Audejean and René Roy, which gave an alternative period solution of 7.1074 hours with an amplitude of 0.32 magnitude.

Diameter and albedo 

According to the survey carried out by NASA's Wide-field Infrared Survey Explorer with its subsequent NEOWISE mission, Timhunter measures 5.20 and 5.528 kilometers in diameter, and its surface has an albedo of 0.333 and 0.27. respectively. The Collaborative Asteroid Lightcurve Link assumes an albedo of 0.23 – derived from 25 Phocaea, the Phocaea family's namesake – and calculates a diameter of 5.79 kilometers, based on an absolute magnitude of 13.4.

Naming 

This minor planet was named after Tim Hunter, an American radiologist and amateur astronomer. Together with David Crawford he co-founded the non-profit International Dark-Sky Association with the aim to preserve and protect Earth's night sky from light pollution. The approved naming citation was published by the Minor Planet Center on 1 June 1996.

Notes

References

External links 
 Asteroid Lightcurve Database (LCDB), query form (info )
 Dictionary of Minor Planet Names, Google books
 Asteroids and comets rotation curves, CdR – Observatoire de Genève, Raoul Behrend
 Discovery Circumstances: Numbered Minor Planets (5001)-(10000) – Minor Planet Center
 
 

006398
Discoveries by Carolyn S. Shoemaker
Discoveries by Eugene Merle Shoemaker
Discoveries by David H. Levy
Named minor planets
19910210